Barnabé Farmian Durosoy,  (1745 – 25 August 1792, Paris) was an 18th-century French journalist and man of letters, both a playwright, poet, novelist, historian and essayist. Founder and editor of a royalist newspaper in 1789, he was the first journalist to die guillotined under the reign of Terror.

Author of history books, literary criticism and political philosophy, he also published poems, songs, epistles, tales in verse, fables and, above all, many plays and ballets and librettos.

Works 
1754: Lettres de Cécile à Julie, ou les Combats de la nature, Text online
1755: Le Cri de l'honneur, épître à la maîtresse que j'ai eue 
1756: Le Génie, le goût et l'esprit, poème en 4 chants, par l'auteur du Poème sur les sens 
1762: Mes dix-neuf ans, ouvrage de mon cœur 
1762: Épître à mon verrou, par l'auteur de Mes dix-neuf ans
1765: Clairval philosophe, ou la Force des passions, mémoires d'une femme retirée du monde (2 volumes)
1766: L'Usage des talens, épître à Mademoiselle Sainval, jeune débutante au Théâtre français
1766: Les Sens, poème en six chants Text online
1769: Essai philosophique sur l'établissement des écoles gratuites de dessein pour les arts mécaniques 
1769: Œuvres mêlées de M. de Rozoi (2 volumes)
1771–1776: Annales de la ville de Toulouse (4  volumes)
1772: Le Vrai ami des hommes, Reprinted in 1796 as a posthumous work by Antoine Léonard Thomas.
1773: Dissertation sur Corneille et Racine, suivie d'une épître en vers 
1774: Le Joyeux Avènement, poème 
1775: Dissertation sur le drame lyrique 
1791: Fragment sentimental en vers français 
Theatre
1765:Les Décius français ou le siège de Calais sous Philippe VI, five-act tragedy in verse, Puteaux, chez le duc de Grammont, 29 July 1767
1770: Azor, ou les Péruviens five-act tragedy in verse, Text online
1771: La Pomme d'or, ballet héroïque in three acts 
1773: Richard III, tragedy in five acts and in verse, Théâtre de Toulouse
1774: Aurore et Azur
1774: Henri IV ou la Bataille d'Ivry, drame lyrique in 3 acts and in prose, Théâtre de l'Hôtel de Bourgogne, 14 November
1775: La Réduction de Paris, drame lyrique in 3 acts, Théâtre de l'Hôtel de Bourgogne, 30 September
1776: Les Mariages samnites, drame lyrique in 3 acts and in prose,  Théâtre de l'Hôtel de Bourgogne, 12 June
1779: Les Deux Amis, drame lyrique in 3 acts, in prose, mingled with ariettes, Château de Versailles, 19 February
1779: Les Trois Roses, ou les Grâces, comedy in 3 acts, in prose, mingled with d'ariettes, Château de Versailles, 10 December
1780: Pygmalion, drame lyrique in 1 act and in prose, Théâtre de l'Hôtel de Bourgogne, 16 December.
1781: L'Inconnue persécutée, comédie opéra in 3 acts, Château de Versailles, 8 June
1783: La Clémence de Henri IV, three-act drama in prose, Comédie Italienne (salle Favart), 14 December 1783
1786: L'Amour filial, comedy in 2 acts and in prose, mingled with d'ariettes, Paris, Théâtre italien (salle Favart), 2 March
1786: Stratonice, ballet héroïque in 3 acts, Château de Versailles, 30 December
1788: Bayard ou le siège de Mezières, comedy in three acts and in verse, Comédie Italienne (salle Favart), 15 July
1789: Les Fourberies de Marine ou le tuteur juge et partie, opéra comique in three acts and in prose, Paris, Théâtre de Monsieur, 11 September

References

Bibliography 
 .
 Pierre Larousse, Grand Dictionnaire universel du XIXe, vol. VI, 1870, (p. 1439–1440)
 Elphège Boursin, Augustin Challamel, Dictionnaire de la Révolution française, Paris, Jouvet et cie, 1893, (p. 286).

External links 
  Barnabé Farmian Durosoy on data.bnf.fr
 His plays on  CÉSAR

 

18th-century French journalists
18th-century French writers
18th-century French male writers
18th-century French dramatists and playwrights
French opera librettists
People executed by guillotine during the French Revolution
1745 births
1792 deaths